The Jakarta Japanese School (JJS; ジャカルタ日本人学校 Jakaruta Nihonjin Gakkō) is a Japanese international school in Pondok Aren, South Tangerang, Indonesia. It is regionally located in the Greater Jakarta area.

See also
 Japanese migration to Indonesia

References

Further reading

Available online:
 "１４年ぶり１０００人超　ジャカルタ日本人学校の在校生数　上海、バンコク、シンガポール、香港に続く　アジア地域で増加顕著 　(2012年08月31日)" (Archive). The Daily Jakarta Shimbun.
 "２５１人、笑顔で新たに挑戦　在校生数、過去最高に　ＪＪＳが入学式　(2014年04月15日)" (Archive). The Daily Jakarta Shimbun.
 "黄組が連覇　１組増え５組で熱戦　ジャカルタ日本人学校体育祭　(2013年06月17日)" (Archive). The Daily Jakarta Shimbun.
 桐生 直 (前ジャカルタ日本人学校　校長; 群馬県前橋市立第五中学校　校長). "ジャカルタ日本人学校における実践と課題 ― 安全対策の事例を通して" (Archive). Tokyo Gakugei University.

Available offline:
 水野 豊生. "(アジアの派遣研修員報告・インドネシア)平穏さを取り戻しつつあるジャカルタ日本人学校." Asia-Oceania report (アジア・オセアニア情報) (71), 29-33, 1999-10. 大和銀総合研究所アジア・オセアニア研究部. See profile at CiNii.
 石井 光信. "危機に遭遇したジャカルタ日本人学校--休校から再開までの4週間 (特集 インドネシア暴動に見る危機対応)." 日外協マンスリ- (209), 19-23, 1998-09. 日本在外企業協会. See profile at CiNii.
 波多野 哲次. "解説:新しいアジアの建築を目指して2 (ジャカルタ日本人学校 波多野哲次/パシフィックコンサルタンツインタ-ナショナル)." 新建築 72(4), 224-226, 1997-04. 新建築社. See profile at CiNii.
 "ジャカルタ日本人学校 波多野哲次/パシフィックコンサルタンツインタ-ナショナル." 新建築 72(4), 220-226, 1997-04. 新建築社. See profile at CiNii.

External links

 Jakarta Japanese School 
 Jakarta Japanese School  (Archive)

Schools in Banten
Jakarta
International schools in Greater Jakarta
Educational institutions established in 1969
1969 establishments in Indonesia
Educational institutions established in 1996
1996 establishments in Indonesia